West Coast Express may refer to:

 West Coast Express, a commuter railway in Metro Vancouver, Canada
 West Coast Express (India), a daily train in India connecting the city of Chennai with the port city of Mangalore in Karnataka 
 West Coast Express (ice hockey), an ice hockey line that played for the Vancouver Canucks in the early 2000s